Andover School is a public combined elementary, middle and high school with Pre-kindergarten located in Andover, Allegany County, New York, U.S.A., and is the only school operated by the Andover Central School District.

Footnotes

Schools in Allegany County, New York
Public high schools in New York (state)